CKV can refer to:
 CKV, IATA airport code for Clarksville–Montgomery County Regional Airport 
 Conformal Killing vector field, sometimes shortened to conformal Killing vector or just CKV, a vector field in conformal geometry